Charles Desmazures (13 October 1669 – 13 February 1736) was a French baroque composer, and organist at the old Marseille Cathedral. He was born at Fère-en-Tardenois (Aisne). In 1701 he dedicated six Pièces de Simphonie (published 1702) to Maria Luisa of Savoy. He died at Marseille, aged 66.

French baroque choir Les Festes d'Orphée  has published some works in the CD collection "Les Maîtres Baroques de Provence"

References 

 Photos of the old cathedral adjacent to the new 1896 structure

External links
 

1669 births
1736 deaths
People from Aisne
French classical organists
French male organists
Male classical organists